Interfaith Alliance is a national interfaith organization in the United States founded in 1994  to counteract the religious right. Its stated goal is to protect faith and freedom by respecting individual rights, preserving the boundaries between religion and government, and uniting diverse voices to protect democracy and to challenge extremism and build common ground.

Leadership
In July 2022, Rev. Paul Raushenbush, was named president and CEO of Interfaith Alliance. He succeeded Rabbi Jack Moline, who had held the post since 2015, and Rev. Dr. C. Welton Gaddy, who serve as President Emiriti of the organization.

Partner organizations
Interfaith Alliance and its partner organization, Interfaith Alliance Foundation, work out of their main office in Washington, D.C. The group has local affiliates around the United States.

Views
Interfaith Alliance recognizes the powerful role that religion plays in America, and it values the positive impact that religious belief can have on American politics. However, Interfaith Alliance's concern is that religion and the United States government are becoming dangerously entangled. Interfaith Alliance believes that religion is being manipulated as a tool to influence policy and advance political strategy. Interfaith Alliance works to ensure the sanctity of religion and the integrity of politics. The group also supports an end to discrimination based on sexual orientation.

In 2019, Interfaith Alliance joined with 42 other religious and allied organizations in issuing a statement opposing Project Blitz, an effort by a coalition of Christian right organizations to influence state legislation.

References

External links
Interfaith Alliance USA website

Interfaith organizations
Political advocacy groups in the United States
Religious organizations based in Washington, D.C.